Hawk Wing (foaled 1999 in Kentucky) is an American-bred, Irish-trained Thoroughbred racehorse. Owned by the Magnier family and trained by Aidan O'Brien, the horse won three Group 1 races and was the leading horse in the world in 2003.

2001: Two-year-old career

He was the top two-year-old of 2001 in the United Kingdom and Ireland, by virtue of a two and a half length win in the National Stakes. He was not undefeated at two, however, having earlier finished second in the Railway Stakes behind a horse named Rock Of Gibraltar. Hawk Wing's subsequent victories in the National Stakes (in an all age course record time), and the Futurity Stakes led him to the position of favorite for the following year's 2,000 Guineas and Epsom Derby.

2002: Three-year-old career

In the 2,000 Guineas, two distinct groups formed on either side of the straight track, with the faster ground on the far side. Hawk Wing was in the group on the stands side, while the group on the far side, containing Rock Of Gibraltar, was travelling slightly further ahead. Hawk Wing beat his own group, and was rapidly closing in on Rock Of Gibraltar but lost by a neck.

His next run was in the 2002 Epsom Derby, where his run in the Guineas was enough to give him the position of market favorite again. He ran second to stablemate High Chaparral. The pair were twelve lengths clear of a field including the winners of three major Derby trials. After the Derby, he subsequently dropped back to 10 furlongs and won the prestigious Eclipse Stakes at Sandown Park. He was beaten a short head by Grandera in a renewal of the Irish Champion Stakes at Leopardstown, further prompting some in believing that he wasn't the most genuine of race horses. A runner-up finish behind Where Or When despite being the heavy favourite in the Queen Elizabeth II Stakes at Ascot and a disappointing Stateside trip to the Breeders' Cup Classic further dented his reputation.

2003: Four-year-old career

He was kept in training at the age of four years. A field of six ran in the 2003 Group One Lockinge Stakes at Newbury, including: Where Or When, who had beaten Hawk Wing in the Queen Elizabeth II Stakes; Olden Times, winner of the Group One Prix Jean Prat; Domedriver, who had inflicted Rock Of Gibraltar's first defeat in eight Group One races in the Breeders' Cup Mile; Reel Buddy (priced at 50-1 despite having been placed in the Group One Sussex Stakes - an indication of the quality of the field); and Celebration Mile winner Tillerman. Hawk Wing beat this Group One field by 11 lengths, with second place Where Or When eight lengths clear of Olden Times in third. Timeform rated him at 136, suggesting that this was the best performance in the world over a mile for nearly ten years.

On his only subsequent outing in the Queen Anne Stakes at Royal Ascot Hawk Wing finished unplaced after suffering a knee ligament injury which ended his racing career.

Stud career
He retired to Coolmore stud in Ireland. His first crop were 2yos of 2007 and included 11 winners as of the 18th August; his sons Let Us Prey and Feared In Flight have BHA Handicap marks of 98 and 97, respectively.  In Australia, his Irish-bred sons Hawk Island (Wyong Cup, Parramatta Cup, and JRA Plate) and Stand To Gain (Sydney Cup) have won stakes races.

After standing for a fee of €15,000 in 2008 Hawk Wing was sold to stand in Korea in a deal arranged by BBA Ireland Ltd. He covered an average of 80 mares a season in his first four years in Korea but demand for his services declined and he is recorded as covering only five mares since 2016.

Pedigree

References

 2002 2000 Guineas on Youtube
 2003 Lockinge Stakes on Youtube

1999 racehorse births
Racehorses bred in Kentucky
Racehorses trained in Ireland
Thoroughbred family 9-g